Acanthochitonina is a  of polyplacophoran mollusc comprising both fossil and extant species.

References 

Chitons
Mollusc suborders